Calosoma sayi, also known as "Say's caterpillar hunter or "Black Caterpillar Hunter",  is a species of ground beetle of the subfamily Carabinae. It was described by Pierre François Marie Auguste Dejean in 1826. A large, lustrous black beetle found throughout the United States, its habitat is fields and disturbed areas.  About 25mm to 28mm long, its grooved elytra have rows of metallic dots or pits. Said pits are smaller than many Calosoma, and are ruby red.   Both larvae and adults prey upon other larvae and pupae, specifically those of grubs, flies, and lepidoptera.

This black caterpillar hunter beetle (Calosoma sayi) was found in Milledgeville, Ga. on August 30th, 2022 in a parking lot. It was first identified by Pierre François Marie Auguste Dejean in 1826.

References

sayi
Beetles described in 1826